Ek Nadir Galpo: Tale of a River is a 2008 Bengali-language Indian feature film directed by Samir Chanda and produced by Sangeeta Ajay Agarwal and Leela Chanda, starring Mithun Chakraborty, Shweta Prasad, Jisshu Sengupta, Anjan Srivastav, Nirmal Kumar and Montu Moha Patra.

The film was India's entry for the Asian, African and Latin American competition segment of the 38th International Film Festival of India (IFFI), held in Goa, 2007.

The film was officially released in theaters on 14 August 2015 even though it was made in 2007.

Plot
Ekk Nadir Galpo is taken from adaptation of short stories of Sunil Gangopadhay. Although initially set to be released on cinema, it went to film festivals worldwide.

It shows the special relationship a father and daughter share. Anu consider Darakeshwar (Mithun) her hero and Anu (Swetha) is his pride, joy and life. Tragedy strikes as Anu drowns in Keleghai river. The bond between Darakeshwar and Anu transcends time and even Anu's death. Now Darakeshwar's only goal is to rename the river Keleghai as Anjana in memory of his loving daughter.

It shows whether Darakeshwar is right in wanting to rename the river and if the names of rivers be changed very easily. The film shows who helps Darakeshwar in his goal and if he manages to rename the river.

Cast
Mithun Chakraborty as Darakeshwar
Shweta Prasad as Anu
Jisshu Sengupta
Anjan Srivastav
Nirmal Kumar
Montu Moha Patra
Krishna Kishore Mukherjee

Critical response 
Times of India gave the film four out of five stars, lauding Ek Nadir Galpo as a visual masterpiece that holds you and glues not only to your seat, but also to the silver screen, wondering what could possibly happen after the intermission. They appreciated director Samir Chanda and lead actor Mithun Chakraborty, mentioning it as one of his career's best performances.

References

External links
 

2008 films
Films based on short fiction
Bengali-language Indian films
2000s Bengali-language films